Malanga may refer to:

Biology

Botany
Xanthosoma, a tropical and sub-tropical edible or ornamental plant, or its starchy bulbotubers
Eddoe (Colocasia esculenta antiquorum), a tropical vegetable closely related to taro

Zoology
Erebus ephesperis, also known as Erebus malanga, a moth species
Eilema triplaiola, also known as Ilema malanga, a moth species

Film
 Malanga (film), 1986 Pakistani film

Music
, Colombian rock band
, Venezuelan pop rock or Venezuelan rock band

People
Malanga (dancer) (1885–1927), Cuban rumba dancer born José Rosario Oviedo
Christian Malanga (born 1983), Congolese politician
Gerard Malanga (born 1943), American poet and filmmaker
Steven Malanga, American journalist
Andrew Malanga, (born 1965), American diplomat and philanthropist

Places
Malanga, neighbourhood in Maputo, Mozambique
Malanga, ancient name of Kanchipuram, India
Char Malanga, village in Bangladesh
Malangas, Zamboanga Sibugay, a town in the Philippines
Malangas Coal Reservation
Malangas Institute

See also
Malagan